Köşektaş is a village in Hacıbektaş district, Nevşehir Province in the Central Anatolia Region of Turkey.

The village is located on the plains at the northern foot of Cappadocia and is 17 kilometers from the Hacıbektaş and, 240 kilometers from the capital, Ankara. Köşektaş takes its name from a rock (Köşektaş Kayası), which is located at the northwest corner of the village.

150 families are living in the village, altogether 409 people (male: 179; female: 230).

Webpage 

 Info page kosektas.net

References

Villages in Hacıbektaş District